Orphans is Charlotte Martin's 2008 release composed of b-sides and other songs written for her previous releases, but were left off the final cuts (hence the EP name Orphans).  Some did not fit the "feeling" of the previous albums, others were popular live songs never recorded until this EP.

Track listing
All songs written by Charlotte Martin.
Is This Called Desire
Galaxies
Habit (LP version)
Outerspace
Snowflakes
The Stalker Song
Raven (Lost Master)
Many Rivers (2005)

Charlotte Martin albums